Toros Ab (also Romanized as Toros Āb; also known as Torsh Āb and Turushāb) is a village in Arabkhaneh Rural District, Shusef District, Nehbandan County, South Khorasan Province, Iran. At the 2006 census, its population was 26, in 9 families.

References 

Populated places in Nehbandan County